Jarrad Nathan Burke (born 7 January 1983) is an Australian cricketer who played Twenty20 cricket for the New South Wales Blues. He is a left-handed batsman and a slow left-arm orthodox bowler. He did not play any first-class or List A cricket for New South Wales.

See also
 List of New South Wales representative cricketers
List of New South Wales Twenty20 cricketers

External links
Cricinfo profile on Jarrad Burke

1983 births
Living people
Australian cricketers
New South Wales cricketers
Cricketers from New South Wales